Ferch-Lienewitz station is a railway station in Ferch-Lienewitz, district of the municipality Schwielowsee located in the district of Potsdam-Mittelmark, Brandenburg, Germany.

References

Railway stations in Brandenburg
Railway stations in Germany opened in 1908
1908 establishments in Prussia
Buildings and structures in Potsdam-Mittelmark